"Super Straight" (also styled as Superstraight) is a song by Australian rock band Regurgitator. The song was released in October 2001 as the second single from the band's fourth studio album Eduardo and Rodriguez Wage War on T-Wrecks. The single peaked at number 55 in Australia and it ranked at number 41 on Triple J's Hottest 100 in 2001.
 
In 2019, Tyler Jenke from The Brag ranked Regurgitator's best songs, with "Super Straight" coming it at number 10. Jenke said "'Super Straight' might hold the distinction as Regurgitator's most 'normal'-sounding song, with lyrics that speak of a family hiding some dark secrets."

Track listings

Music Video

The music video for 'Super Straight' was filmed in July 2001 at the Fairwinds gated townhouse community on Bognor Street in the southern Brisbane suburb of Tingalpa, Queensland.

Charts

Release history

References

 
2001 singles
2001 songs
Regurgitator songs
Songs written by Quan Yeomans
Warner Music Australasia singles